Leonardo Lazaro Cárdenas Alfonso (born December 17, 1938) is a Cuban former professional baseball shortstop, who played in Major League Baseball (MLB) from  to  for the Cincinnati Reds, Minnesota Twins, California Angels, Cleveland Indians, and Texas Rangers. Nicknamed "Mr. Automatic" and "Chico", he was a five-time all-star and one of the best-fielding shortstops of his era.

Early years
Cárdenas was born in Matanzas, Cuba, one of 15 children of Rafael and Roberta Cardenas. He was among the last of the Cuban players to make it out of Cuba before the borders were sealed. He batted .316 for the Arizona–Mexico League's Tucson Cowboys in 1956, and signed with the Cincinnati Reds the following season. The Havana team was moved to Jersey City the following July and renamed the Jerseys.

Major league career

Cincinnati Reds
Cárdenas made his Major League debut on July 25, 1960, starting and batting eighth and playing shortstop in a 6–5 Reds win over the Chicago Cubs at Wrigley Field. After grounding into a double play and later lining out, he notched his first career hit with a seventh-inning run-scoring single off Cubs pitcher Bob Anderson. For the season, he batted .232 with one home run and 12 runs batted in (RBI). After the season, McMillan was dealt to the Milwaukee Braves for pitchers Joey Jay and Juan Pizarro.

Reds Manager Fred Hutchinson's original plan heading into the  season was to platoon Cárdenas and utility infielder Eddie Kasko at short, with Cárdenas being the better fielder and Kasko being the better hitter. Cárdenas, however, surprised his boss with a .308 batting average. He also clubbed five home runs to Kasko's two in 271 fewer at bats.

He remained the Reds' starting shortstop for seven seasons, earning All-Star nods in 1964, 1965, and 1968, and being elected to start in 1966. Cárdenas had eight RBI and belted four home runs in a doubleheader against the Chicago Cubs, on June 5, on his way to setting a club record for home runs by a shortstop with 20 (later broken by Barry Larkin). Following the  season, Cárdenas was traded to the Minnesota Twins for pitcher Jim Merritt.

Minnesota Twins
The Twins had something of a revolving door at short in 1968 with Jackie Hernández, Rick Renick, Ron Clark and César Tovar all manning the position at one point or another. Bringing in Cárdenas for  solidified the Twins at their weakest position, and helped turn around the team's fortune. They went from 79 to 83 and seventh place in the American League (AL) to 97–65 and winning the American League West the first year of divisional play. For his part, Cárdenas batted .280 with 10 home runs and 70 RBI at the bottom of the Twins' batting order. He tied an AL record for assists by a shortstop, with 570.

Cárdenas was batting .285 with 11 home runs and 46 RBI at the 1971 All-Star break to be named to his only AL All-Star team; however, Cárdenas did not appear in the game. He ended the season with 18 home runs and 75 RBI and a stellar .985 fielding percentage to receive the Calvin R. Griffith Award given each season to the Twins' Most Valuable Player.

California Angels
At the 1971 Winter meetings, the California Angels acquired Cárdenas for relief pitcher Dave LaRoche. The acquisition marked former All-Star shortstop Jim Fregosi as trade bait; he would go to the New York Mets for Nolan Ryan a week later.

At 33 years old, Cárdenas was clearly on the decline, by the time he joined the Angels. He batted only .143 in the month of June, and ended the season with a .223 average, six home runs and 42 RBI. During Spring training , Cárdenas was traded to the Cleveland Indians for Tommy McCraw and minor leaguer Bob Marcano to make room for Bobby Valentine at short, whom they had recently acquired from the Los Angeles Dodgers.

Cleveland Indians
With the Indians, Cárdenas found himself in more of a back-up role, for the first time in his career. He made his first big league appearance at third, on August 16, and committed an error.

Texas Rangers
Following Cárdenas‘ only season in Cleveland, he was dealt to the Texas Rangers in a controversial deal for catcher Ken Suarez, who had just filed for arbitration a week before the February 12,  trade. He filed a formal grievance against the Rangers claiming that he was traded in retaliation. Suarez never appeared in a game with the Indians, retiring instead.

Cárdenas, meanwhile, appeared in 34 games for the Rangers, 21 of which were at third base. He spent one more season with the Rangers as a third baseman, before retiring.

Career stats

During his career he powered six home runs off of Hall of Fame pitcher Juan Marichal. Cárdenas led the NL in intentional walks, in 1965 and 1966 (25 and 18, respectively). He was voted into the Cincinnati Reds Hall of Fame, in 1981.

Personal life
Despite having come to the United States in 1956, and twice being married to American women, Cárdenas never got around to applying for American citizenship. He has eight children. In 1998, Cárdenas was sentenced to three months in jail for assault, after breaking out the windows of a car that his wife and a male co-worker were sitting in, and breaking the man's arm with a bat.

Cárdenas lives in Cincinnati and makes regular appearances at the Reds Hall of Fame, Great American Ball Park and every December at Reds Fest.

References

External links

1938 births
Living people
Major League Baseball players from Cuba
Cuban expatriate baseball players in the United States
Major League Baseball shortstops
Cincinnati Reds players
Minnesota Twins players
California Angels players
Cleveland Indians players
Texas Rangers players
Águilas del Zulia players
Tiburones de La Guaira players
Cuban expatriate baseball players in Venezuela
National League All-Stars
American League All-Stars
Sportspeople convicted of crimes
Havana Sugar Kings players
Savannah Redlegs players
Tucson Cowboys players
Prisoners and detainees of Ohio